The steam ferry Puget operated in the early 1900s as part of the Puget Sound Mosquito Fleet.

References 

 Newell, Gordon R., ed., H.W. McCurdy Marine History of the Pacific Northwest,  Superior Publishing Co., Seattle, WA (1966)

Steamboats of Washington (state)
Propeller-driven steamboats of Washington (state)
Ships built in Washington (state)
1908 ships